Takashi Ogino (荻野 貴司, born October 21, 1985 in Asuka, Nara) is a Japanese professional baseball outfielder and shortstop for the Chiba Lotte Marines in Japan's Nippon Professional Baseball.

References

External links

1985 births
Living people
Baseball people from Nara Prefecture
Kwansei Gakuin University alumni
Nippon Professional Baseball outfielders
Japanese baseball players
Chiba Lotte Marines players